MV British Motorist was a 6,891 ton tanker, built by Swan Hunter & Wigham Richardson, Newcastle upon Tyne in 1924 for the British Tanker Company.

She had been carrying oil, aviation fuel and petrol and was refuelling  when the raid commenced. 

Two of her crew were killed out of 61 in the initial attack: the master Gilbert C. Bates and 2nd Radio Operator James H. Webster. 

In 1959–1960, she was salvaged by Fujita Salvage Company, with the fore and aft sections of the hull welded together while the engine room was left, as it was too heavy to refloat. The welded fore and aft was towed back to Japan and broken up.

What remains of British Motorist lies in Darwin Harbour at position .

Footnotes

References

Further reading

External links
The Fujita Salvage Operation, Northern Territory Library online feature
Northern Territory shipwrecks
MV British Motorist shipwreck
Photos of MV British Motorist

Shipwrecks of the Northern Territory
Ships sunk in the bombing of Darwin, 1942
World War II merchant ships of the United Kingdom
Ships of BP Shipping
Merchant ships sunk by aircraft